North American moths represent about 12,000 types of moths. In comparison, there are about 825 species of North American butterflies. The moths (mostly nocturnal) and butterflies (mostly diurnal) together make up the taxonomic order Lepidoptera.

This list is sorted by MONA number (MONA is short for Moths of America North of Mexico). A numbering system for North American moths introduced by Ronald W. Hodges et al. in 1983 in the publication Check List of the Lepidoptera of America North of Mexico. The list has since been updated, but the placement in families is outdated for some species.

This list covers America north of Mexico (effectively the continental United States and Canada). For a list of moths and butterflies recorded from the state of Hawaii, see List of Lepidoptera of Hawaii.

This is a partial list, covering moths with MONA numbers ranging from 6089 to 7648. For the rest of the list, see List of moths of North America.

Pterophoridae
6089 – Agdistis americana
6090 – Sphenarches ontario
6090.1 – Sphenarches anisodactylus
6090.2 – Leptodeuterocopus neales
6091 – Geina periscelidactylus, grape plume moth
6091.1 – Geina sheppardi, Sheppard's plume moth
6092 – Geina tenuidactyla, Himmelman's plume moth
6093 – Geina buscki
6094 – Capperia ningoris
6095 – Capperia evansi
6096 – Capperia raptor
6097 – Oxyptilus delawaricus
6098 – Buckleria parvulus, sundew plume moth
6099 – Trichoptilus potentellus
6099.1 – Exelastis pumilio
6099.2 – Exelastis rhynchosiae
6099.3 – Exelastis montischristi
6100 – Dejongia californicus
6101 – Trichoptilus pygmaeus
6102 – Dejongia lobidactylus
6103 – Michaelophorus indentatus
6104 – Megalorhipida leucodactylus
6105 – Cnaemidophorus rhododactyla, rose plume moth
6106 – Platyptilia tesseradactyla
6107 – Gillmeria pallidactyla
6108 – Platyptilia johnstoni
6109 – Platyptilia carduidactylus, artichoke plume moth
6110 – Platyptilia percnodactylus
6111 – Platyptilia comstocki
6112 – Platyptilia williamsii
6113 – Platyptilia ardua
6114 – Platyptilia washburnensis
6115 – Platyptilia albicans
6116 – Gillmeria albertae
6117 – Anstenoptilia marmarodactyla
6118 – Amblyptilia pica, geranium plume moth
6119 – Lantanophaga pusillidactylus, lantana plume moth
6120 – Lioptilodes albistriolatus
6121.1 – Stenoptilodes taprobanes
6122 – Stenoptilodes brevipennis
6123 – Stenoptilodes antirrhina
6124 – Paraplatyptilia grandis
6125 – Paraplatyptilia carolina
6125.1 – Paraplatyptliia atlantica
6126 – Paraplatyptilia immaculata
6127 – Paraplatyptilia auriga
6127.1 – Paraplatyptilia albui
6127.2 – Paraplatyptilia glacialis
6127.3 – Paraplatyptilia sabourini
6127.4 – Paraplatyptilia watkinsi
6128 – Paraplatyptilia edwardsii
6129 – Paraplatyptilia baueri
6130 – Paraplatyptilia albiciliatus
6131 – Paraplatyptilia lutescens
6132 – Paraplatyptilia albidus
6133 – Paraplatyptilia shastae
6134 – Paraplatyptilia nana
6135 – Paraplatyptilia albidorsellus
6136 – Paraplatyptilia fragilis
6137 – Paraplatyptilia maea
6138 – Paraplatyptilia cooleyi
6139 – Paraplatyptilia xylopsamma
6140 – Paraplatyptilia modestus
6141 – Paraplatyptilia bifida
6142 – Paraplatyptilia petrodactylus
6143 – Stenoptilia pterodactyla
6144 – Stenoptilia zophodactylus
6145 – Stenoptilia pallistriga
6146 – Stenoptilia mengeli
6147 – Amblyptilia bowmani
6148 – Stenoptilia exclamationis
6149 – Stenoptilia coloradensis
6150 – Stenoptilia columbia
6151 – Stenoptilia grandipuncta
6153 – Singularia walsinghami
6154 – Pselnophorus belfragei, Belfrage's plume moth
no number yet – Pselnophorus chihuahuaensis
no number yet – Pselnophorus hodgesi
no number yet – Pselnophorus kutisi
6155 – Adaina bipunctatus
6155.1 – Adaina simplicius
No number yet – Adaina primulacea
6156 – Adaina zephyria
6156.1 – Adaina thomae
6156.2 – Adaina perplexus
6157 – Adaina montanus
6158 – Adaina cinerascens
6159 – Emmelina buscki
6160 – Adaina ambrosiae, ambrosia plume moth
6161 – Oidaematophorus occidentalis
6162 – Oidaematophorus balsamorrhizae
6163 – Oidaematophorus cretidactylus
6164 – Oidaematophorus downesi
6165 – Oidaematophorus guttatus
6166 – Oidaematophorus mathewianus
6167 – Hellinsia fishii
6168 – Oidaematophorus eupatorii, eupatorium plume moth
6169 – Oidaematophorus rogenhoferi
6170 – Oidaematophorus phaceliae
6171 – Oidaematophorus grisescens
6172 – Oidaematophorus cineraceus
6173 – Oidaematophorus rileyi
6174 – Oidaematophorus lindseyi
6175 – Oidaematophorus baroni
6176 – Oidaematophorus castor
No number yet – Hellinsia habecki
6177 – Hellinsia pollux
6178 – Hellinsia mizar
6179 – Hellinsia meyricki
6180 – Hellinsia gratiosus
6181 – Hellinsia fieldi
6182 – Hellinsia confusus
6183 – Hellinsia citrites
6184 – Hellinsia brucei
6185 – Hellinsia albilobata
6186 – Hellinsia inquinatus
6187 – Hellinsia eros
6188 – Hellinsia pan
6189 – Hellinsia phoebus
6190 – Hellinsia thor
6191 – Hellinsia triton
6192 – Hellinsia integratus
6193 – Hellinsia auster
6194 – Hellinsia medius
6195 – Hellinsia linus
6196 – Hellinsia cadmus
6197 – Hellinsia iobates
6198 – Hellinsia cochise
6199 – Hellinsia ares
6200 – Hellinsia tinctus
6201 – Hellinsia thoracica
6202 – Hellinsia helianthi
6203 – Hellinsia homodactylus
6204 – Hellinsia elliottii
6206 – Hellinsia pectodactylus
6207 – Hellinsia paleaceus
6208 – Hellinsia venapunctus
6209 – Hellinsia luteolus
6210 – Hellinsia balanotes, baccharis borer plume moth
6211 – Hellinsia grandis, coyote brush borer plume moth
6212 – Hellinsia kellicottii, goldenrod borer plume moth
6212.1 – Hellinsia chlorias
6213 – Hellinsia lacteodactylus
6214 – Hellinsia glenni
6215 – Hellinsia subochraceus
6216 – Hellinsia sulphureodactylus
6217 – Hellinsia serenus
6218 – Hellinsia australis
6219 – Hellinsia costatus
6220 – Hellinsia falsus
6221 – Hellinsia varius
6222 – Hellinsia varioides
6223 – Hellinsia corvus
6224 – Hellinsia perditus
6225 – Hellinsia simplicissimus
6226 – Hellinsia unicolor
6227 – Hellinsia inconditus
6228 – Hellinsia caudelli
6229 – Hellinsia rigidus
6230 – Hellinsia contortus
6231 – Hellinsia catalinae
6232 – Hellinsia arion
6233 – Hellinsia longifrons
6234 – Emmelina monodactyla, morning-glory plume moth

Drepanoidea
6235 – Habrosyne scripta, lettered habrosyne moth
6236 – Habrosyne gloriosa, glorious habrosyne moth
6237 – Pseudothyatira cymatophoroides, tufted thyatirid moth
6238 – Thyatira mexicana
6239 – Thyatira lorata
6240 – Euthyatira pudens, dogwood thyatirid moth
6241 – Euthyatira semicircularis
6242 – Ceranemota improvisa
6243 – Ceranemota fasciata
6244 – Ceranemota crumbi
6245 – Ceranemota semifasciata
6246 – Ceranemota tearlei
6248 – Ceranemota albertae, Alberta lutestring moth
no number – Ceranemota partida
no number – Ceranemota amplifascia
6250 – Bycombia verdugoensis
6251 – Drepana arcuata, arched hooktip moth
6252 – Drepana bilineata, two-lined hooktip moth
6253 – Eudeilinia herminiata, northern eudeilinea moth
6255 – Oreta rosea, rose hooktip moth

Geometridae
6256 E – Archiearis infans, infant moth
6256.1 E – Boudinotiana hodeberti
6257 E – Leucobrephos brephoides, scarce infant moth
6258 E – Alsophila pometaria, fall cankerworm moth
6259 E – Ametris nitocris, seagrape spanworm moth
6260 E – Almodes terraria
6261 E – Heliomata cycladata, common spring moth
6261.1 E – Heliomata scintillata
6263 E – Heliomata infulata, rare spring moth
6266 W – Protitame subalbaria
6270 B – Protitame virginalis, virgin moth
6271.1 E – Mellilla xanthometata, orangewing moth
6272 E – Eumacaria madopata, brown-bordered geometer moth
6273 E – Speranza pustularia, lesser maple spanworm moth
6274 E – Speranza ribearia, currant spanworm moth
6276 W – Speranza flavicaria
6277 W – Speranza helena
6278 E – Speranza evagaria, drab angle moth
6279 E – Speranza occiduaria
6280 E – Speranza andersoni
6281 W – Speranza simplex
6282 E – Speranza argillacearia, mousy angle moth
6283 B – Speranza sulphurea, sulphur angle moth
6284 W – Speranza amboflava
6285 E – Speranza inextricata
6285.1 E – Speranza exonerata
6286 E – Speranza brunneata
6287 E – Speranza anataria
6287.1 B – Speranza boreata
6288 W – Speranza quadrilinearia
6289 W – Speranza coloradensis
6290 E – Speranza loricaria
6291 W – Speranza semivolata
6292 E – Speranza exauspicata
6293 W – Speranza umbriferata
6294 E – Speranza abruptata
6295 W – Speranza confederata
6296 W – Speranza plumosata
6298 W – Speranza extemporata
6299 E – Speranza coortaria, four-spotted angle moth
6299.1 W – Speranza hesperata
6299.2 W – Speranza prunosata
6300 W – Speranza perornata
6301 W – Speranza guenearia
6301.1 W – Speranza austrinata
6302 W – Speranza trilinearia
6303 E – Speranza subcessaria, barred angle moth
6304 E – Speranza bitactata, split-lined angle moth
6304.1 E – Speranza wauaria
6305 W – Speranza denticulodes
6306 W – Speranza decorata
6308 W – Speranza colata
6309 W – Speranza benigna
6310 W – Speranza schatzeata
6311 W – Speranza graphidaria
6312 W – Speranza deceptrix
6314 E – Speranza varadaria, southern angle moth
6315 W – Speranza grossbecki
6315.1 W – Speranza saphenata
6316 W – Speranza simpliciata
6317 W – Speranza pallipennata
6321 B – Epelis truncataria, black-banded orange moth
6323 W – Speranza marcescaria
6324 W – Speranza lorquinaria, Lorquin's angle moth
6325 W – Letispe metanemaria
6326 B – Macaria aemulataria, common angle moth
6326.1 W – Macaria juglandata
6328.1 W – Psamatodes atrimacularia
6328.2 E – Psamatodes rectilineata
6330 E – Macaria notata, birch angle moth
6331 E – Macaria promiscuata, promiscuous angle moth
6332 W – Psamatodes abydata, dot-lined angle moth
6332.1 E – Psamatodes trientata
6333 W – Psamatodes everiata
6334 E – Macaria carpo
6335 E – Macaria aequiferaria, woody angle moth
6336 E – Macaria distribuaria, southern chocolate angle moth
6337 E – Macaria sanfordi
6338 W – Macaria adonis
6338.1 W – Macaria ponderosae
6339 E – Macaria transitaria, blurry chocolate angle moth
6340 E – Macaria minorata, minor angle moth
6341 B – Macaria bicolorata, bicolored angle moth
6342 B – Macaria bisignata, red-headed inchworm moth
6342.1 B – Macaria masquerata
6343 E – Macaria sexmaculata, six-spotted angle moth
6344 E – Macaria signaria, pale-marked angle moth
6346 W – Macaria unipunctaria
6347 E – Macaria pinistrobata, white pine angle moth
6348 E – Macaria fissinotata, hemlock angle moth
6349 E – Macaria marmorata
6350 E – Macaria submarmorata
6351 E – Macaria oweni
6352 E – Macaria granitata, granite moth
6353 E – Macaria multilineata, many-lined angle moth
6354 W – Psamatodes pallidata
6355 W – Digrammia sublacteolata
6357 E – Digrammia eremiata, three-lined angle moth
6357.1 E – Digrammia equivocata
6358 E – Digrammia ordinata
6359 W – Taeniogramma quadrilinea
6360 E – Trigrammia quadrinotaria, four-spotted angle moth
6362 B – Digrammia continuata, curve-lined angle moth
6363 W – Digrammia excurvata
6363.1 W – Digrammia pallorata
6363.2 W – Digrammia cinereola
6364 W – Digrammia setonana
6365 W – Digrammia pertinata
6366 W – Digrammia napensis
6366.1 W – Digrammia imparilata
6368 W – Digrammia atrofasciata
6368.1 W – Digrammia modocata
6370 B – Digrammia curvata
6371 W – Digrammia nubiculata
6371.1 W – Digrammia palodurata
6372 W – Digrammia pictipennata
6372.1 W – Digrammia terramalata
6373 B – Digrammia denticulata
6374 W – Digrammia delectata
6374.1 W – Digrammia ubiquitata
6376 W – Digrammia burneyata
6377 W – Digrammia muscariata
6377.1 W – Digrammia extenuata
6380 W – Digrammia californiaria, Californian granite moth
6381 W – Digrammia colorata, creosote moth
6383 W – Digrammia pervolata
6385 W – Digrammia triviata
6386 E – Digrammia ocellinata, faint-spotted angle moth
6387 W – Digrammia aliceata
6387.1 W – Digrammia sexpunctata, six-spotted digrammia moth
6389 B – Digrammia decorata, decorated granite moth
6389.1 W – Digrammia plemmelata
6391 B – Digrammia spinata
6392 W – Digrammia indeterminata
6393 W – Digrammia yavapai
6394 B – Digrammia rippertaria
6394.1 W – Digrammia hebetata
6395 W – Digrammia irrorata
6396 B – Digrammia neptaria, dark-bordered granite moth
6397 E – Digrammia mellistrigata, yellow-lined angle moth
6399 B – Digrammia subminiata
6400 W – Digrammia gilletteata
6402 W – Digrammia fieldi
6403 W – Digrammia minuta
6404 W – Digrammia puertata
6405 E – Digrammia gnophosaria, hollow-spotted angle moth
6406 W – Rindgea parcata
6406.1 E – Rindgea disparcata
6407 W – Rindgea nigricomma
6408 W – Rindgea piccoloi
6409 E – Rindgea stipularia
6409.1 B – Rindgea prolificata
6410 E – Digrammia pallidata
6411 W – Rindgea maricopa
6412 W – Rindgea flaviterminata
6413 B – Rindgea subterminata
6414 W – Rindgea s-signata, signate looper moth
6415 W – Rindgea cyda, mesquite looper moth
6416 W – Rindgea ballandrata
6417 W – Rindgea hypaethrata
6419 E – Isturgia dislocaria, pale-veined isturgia moth
6420 W – Fernaldella fimetaria, green broomweed looper moth
6420.1 E – Fernaldella georgiana
6421 W – Fernaldella stalachtaria
6422 W – Protitame cervula
6423 W – Taeniogramma octolineata
6424 W – Taeniogramma mendicata
6425 W – Taeniogramma tenebrosata
6426 W – Dasyfidonia avuncularia, red-winged wave moth
6427 W – Dasyfidonia macdunnoughi
6428 E – Orthofidonia tinctaria
6429 E – Orthofidonia exornata
6430 E – Orthofidonia flavivenata, yellow-veined geometer moth
6431 E – Hesperumia sulphuraria, sulphur moth
6432 W – Hesperumia fumosaria
6433 W – Hesperumia latipennis
6434 W – Hesperumia fumida
6435 W – Neoalcis californiaria, brown-lined looper moth
6436 E – Ematurga amitaria, cranberry spanworm moth
6437 E – Hypomecis luridula
6438 E – Hypomecis buchholzaria
6439 E – Hypomecis umbrosaria, umber moth
6439.1 E – Hypomecis longipectinaria
6440 E – Hypomecis gnopharia
6441 W – Pimaphera percata
6442 E – Pimaphera sparsaria
6443 E – Glenoides texanaria, Texas gray moth
6444 E – Glenoides lenticuligera
6445 W – Glena grisearia
6446 W – Glena furfuraria
6447 W – Glena arcana
6448 W – Glena nigricaria
6449 E – Glena cribrataria, dotted gray moth
6450 B – Glena cognataria, blueberry gray moth
6450.1 – Glaucina incognitaria
6451 W – Glena interpunctata
6452 B – Glena plumosaria, dainty gray moth
6453 W – Glena quinquelinearia, five-lined gray moth
6454 W – Glena macdunnougharia
6455 W – Stenoporpia pulchella
6456 W – Stenoporpia margueritae
6457 W – Stenoporpia asymmetra
6458 W – Stenoporpia dionaria
6459 B – Stenoporpia polygrammaria
6460 W – Stenoporpia mediatra
6461 W – Stenoporpia dissonaria
6462 W – Stenoporpia anastomosaria
6463 B – Stenoporpia pulmonaria
6464 W – Stenoporpia purpuraria
6465 W – Stenoporpia vernata
6466 W – Stenoporpia vernalella
6467 W – Stenoporpia insipidaria
6468 W – Stenoporpia anellula
6469 W – Stenoporpia badia
6470 W – Stenoporpia macdunnoughi
6471 W – Stenoporpia blanchardi
6472 W – Stenoporpia glaucomarginaria
6473 B – Stenoporpia separataria
6474 B – Stenoporpia excelsaria
6475 W – Stenoporpia larga
6476 W – Stenoporpia graciella
6477 W – Stenoporpia lea
6478 E – Exelis pyrolaria, fine-lined gray moth
6479 E – Exelis dicolus
6480 B – Exelis ophiurus
6481 B – Tornos punctata
6482 B – Tornos hoffmanni
6483 W – Tornos benjamini
6484 W – Tornos erectarius
6485 E – Tornos cinctarius
6486 E – Tornos scolopacinaria, dimorphic gray moth
6487 E – Tornos abjectarius
6488 W – Glaucina erroraria
6489 W – Glaucina biartata
6490 W – Glaucina utahensis
6491 W – Glaucina cilla
6492 W – Glaucina macdunnoughi
6493 W – Glaucina epiphysaria
6494 W – Glaucina baea
6495 W – Glaucina escaria
6496 W – Glaucina eupetheciaria
6496.1 W – Glaucina lucida
6497 W – Glaucina elongata
6498 W – Glaucina golgolata
6499 W – Glaucina magnifica
6500 W – Glaucina ampla
6501 W – Glaucina bifida
6502 W – Glaucina interruptaria
6503 W – Glaucina spaldingata
6504 W – Glaucina gonia
6505 W – Glaucina platia
6506 W – Glaucina nephos
6507 W – Glaucina infumataria
6508 W – Glaucina ignavaria
6509 W – Glaucina lowensis
6510 W – Glaucina dispersa
6511 W – Glaucina denticularia
6512 W – Glaucina imperdata
6513 W – Glaucina mayelisaria
6514 W – Glaucina nota
6515 W – Glaucina eureka
6515.1 W – Glaucina agnesae
6516 W – Glaucina ochrofuscaria
6517 W – Glaucina loxa
6518 W – Glaucina anomala
6519 W – Synglochis perumbraria
6520 W – Eubarnesia ritaria
6521 W – Paraglaucina hulstinoides
6522 B – Nepterotaea diagonalis
6523 W – Nepterotaea marjorae
6524 E – Nepterotaea ozarkensis
6525 W – Nepterotaea dorotheata
6526 – Nepterotaea furva
6527 W – Nepterotaea memoriata
6528 W – Nepterotaea obliviscata
6529 W – Chesiadodes simularia
6530 W – Chesiadodes cinerea
6531 W – Chesiadodes morosata
6532 W – Chesiadodes tubercula
6533 W – Chesiadodes polingi
6534 W – Chesiadodes bicolor
6535 W – Chesiadodes coniferaria
6536 W – Chesiadodes fusca
6537 W – Chesiadodes curvata
6538 W – Chesiadodes longa
6539 W – Chesiadodes dissimilis
6540 W – Hulstina formosata
6541 W – Hulstina imitatrix
6542 W – Hulstina tanycraeros
6543 W – Hulstina aridata
6544 W – Hulstina xera
6545 W – Hulstina grossbecki
6546 W – Hulstina exhumata
6547 W – Hulstina wrightiaria, Wright's hulstina moth
6548 W – Pterotaea crickmeri
6549 W – Pterotaea crinigera
6549.1 – Pterotaea depromaria
6550 W – Pterotaea sperryae
6551 W – Pterotaea leuschneri
6552 W – Pterotaea plagia
6553 W – Pterotaea lamiaria
6554 W – Pterotaea campestraria
6555 W – Pterotaea succurva
6556 W – Pterotaea glauca
6557 W – Pterotaea cavea
6558 W – Pterotaea miscella
6559 W – Pterotaea systole
6560 W – Pterotaea euroa
6561 W – Pterotaea lira
6562 W – Pterotaea obscura
6563 W – Pterotaea comstocki
6564 W – Pterotaea macrocercos
6565 W – Pterotaea powelli
6566 W – Pterotaea albescens
6567 W – Pterotaea melanocarpa
6568 W – Pterotaea cariosa
6569 W – Pterotaea newcombi
6570 E – Aethalura intertexta, four-barred gray moth
6571 E – Iridopsis cypressaria
6572 W – Iridopsis jacumbaria
6573 W – Iridopsis dataria
6574 W – Iridopsis angulata
6575 W – Iridopsis clivinaria, mountain mahogany looper moth
6575.1 W – Iridopsis profanata
6576 W – Iridopsis sanctissima
6577 W – Iridopsis obliquaria, oblique looper moth
6578 W – Iridopsis providentia
6579 W – Iridopsis sancta
6580 E – Iridopsis pergracilis, cypress looper moth
6581 B – Iridopsis perfectaria
6582 E – Iridopsis vellivolata, large purplish gray moth
6583 E – Iridopsis ephyraria, pale-winged gray moth
6584 E – Iridopsis humaria, small purplish gray moth
6585 W – Iridopsis fragilaria
6586 E – Iridopsis defectaria, brown-shaded gray moth
6587 – Iridopsis gemella
6587.1 – Iridopsis pseudoherse
6588 E – Iridopsis larvaria, bent-line gray moth
6589 W – Iridopsis emasculatum
6590 B – Anavitrinella pampinaria, common gray moth
6591 W – Anavitrinella atristrigaria, Gulf Coast gray moth
6592 W – Anavitrinella addendaria
6593 W – Anavitrinella ocularia
6594 E – Cleora sublunaria, double-lined gray moth
6595 E – Cleora projecta, projecta gray moth
6596 W – Gnophos macguffini
6597 E – Ectropis crepuscularia, small engrailed moth
6598 E – Protoboarmia porcelaria, porcelain gray moth
6599 E – Epimecis hortaria, tulip-tree beauty moth
6600 E – Epimecis subaustralis
6601 E – Epimecis matronaria
6602 E – Epimecis anonaria
6603 E – Epimecis fraternaria
6604 E – Epimecis detexta, avocado spanworm moth
6605 W – Mericisca gracea
6606 W – Mericisca perpictaria
6607 W – Mericisca scobina
6608 W – Parapheromia cassinoi
6609 W – Parapheromia lichenaria
6610 – Parapheromia ficta
6611 W – Parapheromia configurata
6612 W – Parapheromia falsata
6613 W – Prionomelia spododea
6614 W – Prionomelia ceraea
6615 W – Tracheops bolteri
6616 E – Melanochroia chephise, white-tipped black moth
6617 E – Melanochroia geometroides
6618 W – Melanolophia imitata, western carpet moth
6619 W – Melanolophia centralis
6620 E – Melanolophia canadaria, Canadian melanolophia moth
6621 E – Melanolophia signataria, signate melanolophia moth
6622 E – Melanolophia imperfectaria
6623 W – Carphoides setigera, green carphoides moth
6624 W – Carphoides incopriarius
6625 W – Carphoides inconspicuaria
6626 W – Antiphoides errantaria
6627 W – Galenara consimilis
6628 W – Galenara lallata
6629 W – Galenara glaucaria
6630 W – Galenara lixaria
6631 W – Galenara lixarioides
6632 W – Galenara stenomacra
6633 W – Galenara olivacea
6634 W – Vinemina perdita
6635 W – Vinemina opacaria
6636 W – Vinemina catalina
6637 E – Eufidonia convergaria
6638 E – Eufidonia notataria, powder moth
6639 E – Eufidonia discospilata, sharp-lined powder moth
6639.1 W – Astalotesia bucurvata
6640 B – Biston betularia, peppered moth
6641 W – Biston multidentata
6642 W – Cochisea rigidaria
6643 – Cochisea barnesi
6644 W – Cochisea undulata
6645 W – Cochisea paula
6646 W – Cochisea unicoloris
6647 W – Cochisea sonomensis
6648 W – Cochisea recisa
6649 W – Cochisea curva
6650 W – Cochisea sinuaria
6651 B – Lycia ursaria, stout spanworm moth
6652 E – Lycia ypsilon, woolly gray moth
6653 B – Lycia rachelae, twilight moth
6654 E – Hypagyrtis unipunctata, one-spotted variant moth
6655 E – Hypagyrtis esther, Esther moth
6656 E – Hypagyrtis piniata, pine measuringworm moth
6657 E – Hypagyrtis brendae, Brenda's hypagyrtis moth
6658 E – Phigalia titea, half-wing moth
6659 E – Phigalia denticulata, toothed phigalia moth
6660 E – Phigalia strigataria, small phigalia moth
6661 W – Phigalia plumogeraria, walnut spanworm moth
6662 B – Paleacrita vernata, spring cankerworm moth
6663 B – Paleacrita merriccata, white-spotted cankerworm moth
6664 W – Paleacrita longiciliata
6665 B – Erannis tiliaria, linden looper moth
6665.1 W – Erannis vancouverensis
6666 B – Lomographa semiclarata, bluish spring moth
6667 E – Lomographa vestaliata, white spring moth
6668 E – Lomographa glomeraria, gray spring moth
6669 W – Lomographa elsinora
6669.1 – Molybdogompha polymygmata
6670 E – Phrygionis auriferaria, golden-winged palyas moth
6671 E – Phrygionis paradoxata, jeweled satyr moth
6671.2 – Phrygionis privignaria
6672 W – Sericosema juturnaria, bordered fawn moth
6673 W – Sericosema immaculata
6674 W – Sericosema wilsonensis
6675 W – Sericosema simularia
6676 B – Cabera exanthemata
6677 E – Cabera erythemaria, yellow-dusted cream moth
6678 E – Cabera variolaria, vestal moth
6679 E – Cabera borealis
6680 E – Cabera quadrifasciaria, four-lined cabera moth
6681 W – Eudrepanulatrix rectifascia
6682 W – Drepanulatrix unicalcararia, spurred wave moth
6683 W – Drepanulatrix hulstii
6684 W – Drepanulatrix bifilata
6685 W – Drepanulatrix quadraria
6686 W – Drepanulatrix foeminaria
6686.1 W – Drepanulatrix garneri
6687 W – Drepanulatrix nevadaria
6688 W – Drepanulatrix carnearia
6689 W – Drepanulatrix falcataria
6690 W – Drepanulatrix secundaria
6691 W – Drepanulatrix baueraria
6692 W – Drepanulatrix monicaria
6693 E – Apodrepanulatrix liberaria
6694 W – Apodrepanulatrix litaria
6695 W – Ixala desperaria
6696 W – Ixala proutearia
6697 W – Ixala klotsi
6698 W – Ixala adventaria
6699 E – Numia terebintharia
6700 W – Chloraspilates bicoloraria, bicolored chloraspilates moth
6701 W – Chloraspilates minima
6702 E – Erastria decrepitaria
6703 W – Erastria viridirufaria
6704 E – Erastria coloraria, broad-lined erastria moth
6705 E – Erastria cruentaria, thin-lined erastria moth
6706 W – Pterospoda nigrescens
6707 W – Pterospoda opuscularia
6708 W – Pterospoda kunzei
6709 W – Stergamataea inornata
6710 W – Stergamataea delicatum
6711 E – Ilecta intractata, black-dotted ruddy moth
6712 E – Thysanopyga proditata
6713 E – Episemasia solitaria
6714 B – Episemasia cervinaria
6715 B – Aspitates aberrata
6716 E – Aspitates forbesi
6716.1 – Aspitates ochrearia
6717 E – Aspitates orciferaria
6718 E – Aspitates conspersarius
6719 W – Aspitates taylori
6720 E – Lytrosis unitaria, common lytrosis moth
6721 E – Lytrosis sinuosa, sinuous lytrosis moth
6722 B – Lytrosis heitzmanorum
6723 E – Lytrosis permagnaria
6724 E – Euchlaena serrata, saw-wing moth
6725 E – Euchlaena muzaria, muzaria euchlaena moth
6726 E – Euchlaena obtusaria, obtuse euchlaena moth
6727 W – Euchlaena silacea
6728 E – Euchlaena effecta, effective euchlaena moth
6729 E – Euchlaena johnsonaria, Johnson's euchlaena moth
6730 W – Euchlaena mollisaria
6731 E – Euchlaena madusaria, scrub euchlaena moth
6732 E – Euchlaena deplanaria
6733 E – Euchlaena amoenaria, deep yellow euchlaena moth
6734 E – Euchlaena marginaria, ochre euchlaena moth
6735 E – Euchlaena pectinaria, forked euchlaena moth
6736 W – Euchlaena manubiaria
6737 B – Euchlaena tigrinaria, mottled euchlaena moth
6738 E – Euchlaena milnei
6739 E – Euchlaena irraria, least-marked euchlaena moth
6740 E – Xanthotype urticaria, false crocus geometer moth
6741 W – Xanthotype barnesi
6742 E – Xanthotype rufaria, rufous geometer moth
6743 E – Xanthotype sospeta, crocus geometer moth
6744 E – Xanthotype attenuaria
6745 E – Cymatophora approximaria, giant gray moth
6746 E – Stenaspilatodes antidiscaria
6747 B – Pero meskaria, Meske's pero moth
6748 B – Pero ancetaria, Hübner's pero moth
6749 W – Pero radiosaria
6750 W – Pero inviolata
6751 W – Pero flavisaria
6752 E – Pero zalissaria
6753 E – Pero honestaria, honest pero moth
6755 E – Pero morrisonaria, Morrison's pero moth
6756 W – Pero giganteus
6757 W – Pero mizon
6758 W – Pero macdunnoughi
6759 W – Pero modestus
6760 W – Pero behrensaria
6761 W – Pero occidentalis
6762 E – Pero nerisaria
6762.1 W – Pero pima
6762.2 W – Pero catalina
6762.3 – Pero lastima
6763 E – Phaeoura quernaria, oak beauty moth
6764 W – Phaeoura cristifera
6765 W – Phaeoura kirkwoodi
6766 B – Phaeoura mexicanaria
6767 W – Phaeoura belua
6768 W – Phaeoura perfidaria
6769 W – Phaeoura utahensis
6770 W – Phaeoura aetha
6771 W – Phaeoura cana
6772 – Thyrinteina arnobia
6773 W – Holochroa dissociarius
6774 W – Aethaloida packardaria
6775 – Hemimorina dissociata
6776 W – Hemnypia baueri
6777 W – Parexcelsa ultraria
6778 W – Ceratonyx arizonensis
6779 W – Ceratonyx permagnaria
6780 E – Ceratonyx satanaria
6781 W – Gabriola dyari
6782 W – Gabriola sierrae
6783 W – Gabriola minima
6784 W – Gabriola minor
6785 W – Gabriola regularia
6786 W – Yermoia perplexata
6787 W – Yermoia glaucina
6788 W – Animomyia smithii
6789 W – Animomyia dilatata
6790 B – Animomyia hardwicki
6791 W – Animomyia morta
6792 W – Animomyia turgida
6793 W – Animomyia nuda
6794 W – Animomyia minuta
6795 – Colotois pennaria
6796 B – Campaea perlata, pale beauty moth
6797 E – Ennomos magnaria, maple spanworm moth
6797.1 W – Ennomos alniaria, canary-shouldered thorn moth
6798 E – Ennomos subsignaria, elm spanworm moth
6799 B – Spodolepis substriataria
6800 E – Sphacelodes vulneraria
6801 E – Sphacelodes haitiaria
6802 W – Philedia punctomacularia
6803 E – Petrophora divisata, common petrophora moth
6804 E – Petrophora subaequaria, northern petrophora moth
6805 E – Tacparia zalissaria
6806 E – Tacparia atropunctata
6807 E – Tacparia detersata, pale alder moth
6808 W – Thallophaga taylorata
6809 W – Thallophaga hyperborea
6810 W – Thallophaga nigroseriata
6811 E – Homochlodes lactispargaria
6812 E – Homochlodes fritillaria, pale homochlodes moth
6813 E – Homochlodes disconventa
6815 E – Gueneria similaria
6816 W – Slossonia rubrotincta
6817 E – Selenia alciphearia, northern selenia moth
6818 E – Selenia kentaria, Kent's geometer moth
6819 B – Metanema inatomaria, pale metanema moth
6820 E – Metanema determinata, dark metanema moth
6821 B – Metarranthis warneri, Warner's metarranthis moth
6822 E – Metarranthis duaria, ruddy metarranthis moth
6823 E – Metarranthis angularia, angled metarranthis moth
6824 E – Metarranthis amyrisaria
6825 B – Metarranthis indeclinata, pale metarranthis moth
6826 E – Metarranthis hypochraria, common metarranthis moth
6827 E – Metarranthis refractaria, refracted metarranthis moth
6828 E – Metarranthis homuraria, purplish metarranthis moth
6829 E – Metarranthis lateritiaria
6830 E – Metarranthis pilosaria
6831 E – Metarranthis apiciaria
6832 E – Metarranthis obfirmaria, yellow-washed metarranthis moth
6833 E – Metarranthis mollicularia
6834 E – Cepphis decoloraria, dark scallop moth
6835 E – Cepphis armataria, scallop moth
6836 B – Plagodis pulveraria, American barred umber moth
6837 B – Probole alienaria, alien probole moth
6838 B – Probole amicaria, friendly probole moth
6839 E – Probole nepiasaria, heath probole moth
6840 E – Plagodis serinaria, lemon plagodis moth
6841 E – Plagodis kuetzingi, purple plagodis moth
6842 E – Plagodis phlogosaria, straight-lined plagodis moth
6843 E – Plagodis fervidaria, fervid plagodis moth
6844 E – Plagodis alcoolaria, hollow-spotted plagodis moth
6845 W – Philtraea elegantaria
6846 W – Philtraea utahensis
6847 W – Philtraea surcaliforniae
6848 W – Philtraea latifoliae
6849 W – Philtraea albimaxima
6850 W – Philtraea paucimacula
6851 E – Philtraea monillata
6852 W – Eriplatymetra coloradaria
6853 W – Eriplatymetra lentifluata
6854 W – Eriplatymetra grotearia
6855 W – Melemaea magdalena
6856 W – Melemaea virgata
6857 W – Lychnosea helveolaria
6858 E – Lychnosea intermicata
6859 W – Neoterpes ephelidaria
6860 W – Neoterpes trianguliferata
6861 W – Neoterpes edwardsata
6862 W – Neoterpes graefiaria
6863 E – Caripeta divisata, gray spruce looper moth
6864 E – Caripeta piniata, northern pine looper moth
6865 W – Caripeta aequaliaria, red girdle moth
6865.1 W – Caripeta suffusata
6866 W – Caripeta interalbicans
6867 E – Caripeta angustiorata, brown pine looper moth
6868 E – Caripeta latiorata
6869 E – Caripeta aretaria, southern pine looper moth
6870 W – Caripeta pulcherrima
6871 W – Caripeta hilumaria
6872 W – Caripeta canidiaria
6873 W – Caripeta ocellaria
6874 W – Caripeta macularia
6875 W – Snowia montanaria
6876 W – Nemeris speciosa
6876.1 W – Nemeris percne
6876.2 W – Nemeris sternitzkyi
6877 W – Meris paradoxa
6878 W – Meris suffusaria
6879 W – Meris patula
6879.1 – Meris alticola
6879.2 – Meris cultrata
6880 W – Destutia flumenata
6881 W – Destutia novata
6882 W – Destutia oblentaria
6883 W – Destutia excelsa
6884 E – Besma endropiaria, straw besma moth
6885 B – Besma quercivoraria, oak besma moth
6886 W – Besma rubritincta
6887 W – Besma sesquilinearia
6888 B – Lambdina fiscellaria, hemlock looper moth
6889 E – Lambdina pultaria, southern oak looper moth
6890 W – Lambdina flavilinearia
6891 W – Lambdina laeta
6892 E – Lambdina pellucidaria, yellow-headed looper moth
6893 E – Lambdina canitiaria
6894 E – Lambdina fervidaria, curve-lined looper moth
6895 W – Lambdina vitraria
6896 W – Lambdina phantoma
6897 W – Evita hyalinaria
6898 E – Cingilia catenaria, chain-dotted geometer moth
6899 W – Nepytia umbrosaria
6900 W – Nepytia regulata
6901 W – Nepytia disputata
6902 W – Nepytia janetae
6903 W – Nepytia juabata
6904 W – Nepytia lagunata
6905 W – Nepytia swetti
6906 E – Nepytia canosaria, false hemlock looper moth
6907 W – Nepytia phantasmaria, phantom hemlock looper moth
6908 E – Nepytia semiclusaria, pine conelet looper moth
6909 E – Nepytia pellucidaria
6910 W – Nepytia freemani
6911 B – Sicya crocearia
6912 B – Sicya macularia, sharp-lined yellow moth
6913 W – Sicya laetula
6914 W – Sicya pergilvaria
6915 W – Sicya morsicaria
6916 W – Sicya olivata
6916.1 – Sicyopsis blanchardata
6917 W – Euaspilates spinataria
6918 W – Eucaterva variaria
6919 W – Eucaterva bonniwelli
6920 W – Acanthotoca graefi
6921 W – Plataea calcaria
6921.1 – Plataea blanchardaria
6922 W – Plataea personaria
6923 W – Plataea ursaria
6924 W – Plataea californiaria
6925 W – Plataea diva
6926 W – Plataea trilinearia, sagebrush girdle moth
6927 W – Eusarca falcata
6928 W – Eusarca terraria
6929 W – Eusarca argillaria
6930 W – Eusarca galbanaria
6931 W – Eusarca detractaria
6932 W – Eusarca lutzi
6933 E – Eusarca fundaria, dark-edged eusarca moth
6934 E – Eusarca subflavaria
6935 – Eusarca distycharia
6936 B – Eusarca packardaria, Packard's eusarca moth
6937 W – Eusarca venosaria
6938 W – Eusarca subcineraria
6939 W – Eusarca geniculata
6940 W – Eusarca tibiaria
6941 B – Eusarca confusaria, confused eusarca moth
6942 W – Eusarca graceiaria
6943 W – Somatolophia desolata
6944 W – Somatolophia montana
6945 W – Somatolophia ectrapelaria
6946 W – Somatolophia pallescens
6947 W – Somatolophia haydenata
6948 W – Somatolophia incana
6948.1 W – Somatolophia vatia
6948.2 W – Somatolophia petila
6948.3 W – Somatolophia simplicius
6948.4 W – Somatolophia cuyama
6949 W – Pherne placeraria
6950 W – Pherne parallelia
6951 W – Pherne sperryi
6952 W – Pherne subpunctata
6953 W – Tetracis fuscata
6954 W – Tetracis jubararia, October thorn moth
6954.1 W – Tetracis montanaria
6955 W – Tetracis pallulata
6956 W – Tetracis cervinaria
6956.1 W – Tetracis australis
6957 W – Caripeta triangulata
6958 W – Tetracis formosa
6959 W – Tetracis barnesii
6960 W – Tetracis hirsutaria
6960.1 W – Tetracis pallidata
6961 W – Tetracis mosesiani
6962 W – Metanema brunneilinearia
6963 E – Tetracis crocallata, yellow slant-line moth
6964 E – Tetracis cachexiata, white slant-line moth
6965 E – Eugonobapta nivosaria, snowy geometer moth
6966 E – Eutrapela clemataria, curve-toothed geometer moth
6967 E – Oxydia vesulia, spurge spanworm moth
6968 E – Oxydia cubana, Cuban spanworm moth
6969 E – Oxydia gueneei
6970 E – Oxydia nimbata
6971 W – Oxydia mundata
6972 E – Oxydia masthala
6973 W – Phyllodonta peccataria
6973.1 W – Phyllodonta sarukhani
6974 E – Patalene olyzonaria, juniper geometer moth
6975 E – Patalene epionata
6976 – Patalene nicoaria
6977 W – Prochoerodes truxaliata
6978 W – Prochoerodes amplicineraria
6979 W – Prochoerodes accentuata
6980 – Prochoerodes nonangulata
6981 W – Prochoerodes forficaria
6982 B – Prochoerodes lineola, large maple spanworm moth
6983 – Prochoerodes olivata
6984 W – Pityeja ornata
6985 E – Nepheloleuca politia
6986 E – Nepheloleuca floridata
6987 E – Antepione thisoaria, variable antepione moth
6990 W – Antepione imitata
6992 W – Pionenta ochreata
6994 E – Sericoptera virginaria
6995 W – Sabulodes aegrotata
6996 W – Sabulodes dissimilis
6997 W – Sabulodes sericeata
6998 W – Sabulodes huachuca
6999 W – Sabulodes mabelata
7000 W – Sabulodes niveostriata
7001 W – Sabulodes olifata
7002 W – Sabulodes duoangulata
7003 W – Sabulodes spoliata
7004 W – Sabulodes edwardsata
7005 W – Enypia venata, variable girdle moth
7006 W – Enypia griseata, mountain girdle moth
7007 W – Enypia packardata, Packard's girdle moth
7008 W – Enypia coolidgi
7009 E – Ligdia wagneri
7010 B – Nematocampa resistaria, horned spanworm moth
7010.1 E – Nematocampa baggettaria, Baggett's spanworm moth
7011 W – Nematocampa brehmeata
7011.1 – Tesiophora entephros
7011.2 – Anavinemia acomos
7012 W – Chlorosea nevadaria
7013 W – Chlorosea banksaria
7014 W – Chlorosea margaretaria
7015 W – Chlorosea roseitacta
7016 W – Nemoria pulcherrima
7017 W – Nemoria mutaticolor
7018 B – Nemoria unitaria, single-lined emerald moth
7019 W – Nemoria latirosaria
7020 W – Nemoria aemularia
7021 W – Nemoria arizonaria
7022 W – Nemoria daedalea
7023 W – Nemoria viridicaria
7024 W – Nemoria subsequens
7025 W – Nemoria diamesa
7026 W – Nemoria albaria
7027 W – Nemoria pistaciaria
7028 E – Nemoria extremaria
7029 E – Nemoria elfa, cypress emerald moth
7030 E – Nemoria tuscarora
7031 E – Nemoria catachloa
7032 E – Nemoria outina
7033 E – Nemoria lixaria, red-bordered emerald moth
7034 E – Nemoria saturiba
7035 W – Nemoria darwiniata, Columbian emerald moth
7036 W – Nemoria zelotes
7037 W – Nemoria obliqua
7038 W – Nemoria splendidaria
7039 W – Nemoria strigataria
7040 W – Nemoria zygotaria
7041 W – Nemoria leptalea
7042 W – Nemoria caerulescens
7043 W – Nemoria intensaria
7044 W – Nemoria festaria
7044.1 – Nemoria albilineata
7045 E – Nemoria bifilata, white-barred emerald moth
7046 E – Nemoria bistriaria, red-fringed emerald moth
7047 E – Nemoria rubrifrontaria, red-fronted emerald moth
7048 E – Nemoria mimosaria, white-fringed emerald moth
7049 W – Nemoria glaucomarginaria
7050 W – Nemoria rindgei
7051 E – Phrudocentra centrifugaria
7052 W – Phrudocentra neis
7053 E – Dichorda iridaria, showy emerald moth
7054 W – Dichorda consequaria
7055 W – Dichorda illustraria
7056 W – Dichorda rectaria
7057 W – Dichordophora phoenix, phoenix emerald moth
7058 B – Synchlora aerata, wavy-lined emerald moth
7059 B – Synchlora frondaria, southern emerald moth
7060 E – Synchlora xysteraria
7060.1 E – Synchlora gerularia
7061 E – Synchlora herbaria
7062 W – Synchlora irregularia
7063 W – Synchlora noel
7064 E – Synchlora cupedinaria
7065 W – Synchlora bistriaria, oblique-striped emerald moth
7066 W – Synchlora pectinaria
7067 W – Synchlora faseolaria
7068 W – Synchlora graefiaria
7069 W – Lophochorista lesteraria
7070 E – Eueana niveociliaria
7071 E – Chlorochlamys chloroleucaria, blackberry looper moth
7072 W – Chlorochlamys triangularis
7073 W – Chlorochlamys appellaria
7074 W – Chlorochlamys phyllinaria, thin-lined chlorochlamys moth
7075 E – Chloropteryx tepperaria, angle-winged emerald moth
7076 W – Chloropteryx nordicaria
7077 E – Chloropteryx paularia
7078 W – Xerochlora viridipallens
7079 W – Xerochlora inveterascaria
7080 W – Xerochlora martinaria
7081 W – Xerochlora masonaria
7082 W – Xerochlora mesotheides
7083 W – Hemithea aestivaria, common emerald moth
7084 E – Hethemia pistasciaria, pistachio emerald moth
7085 B – Mesothea incertata, day emerald moth
7086 E – Eumacrodes yponomeutaria
7087 W – Euacidalia sericearia
7088 W – Euacidalia puerta
7089 W – Euacidalia quakerata
7090 E – Euacidalia brownsvillea
7091 – Euacidalia nigridaria
7092 W – Protoproutia rusticaria
7093 W – Protoproutia laredoata
7094 B – Lobocleta ossularia, drab brown wave moth
7095 W – Lobocleta granitaria
7096 W – Lobocleta quaesitata
7097 B – Lobocleta plemyraria, straight-lined wave moth
7098 W – Lobocleta lanceolata
7099 W – Lobocleta griseata
7100 B – Lobocleta peralbata
7101 E – Idaea minuta
7102 B – Idaea bonifata
7103 W – Idaea nibseata
7104 E – Idaea microphysa
7105 E – Idaea scintillularia, diminutive wave moth
7106 E – Idaea insulensis
7107 E – Idaea pervertipennis
7108 B – Idaea furciferata, notch-winged wave moth
7109 E – Idaea celtima
7110 W – Idaea basinta, red-and-white wave moth
7111 W – Idaea skinnerata
7112 B – Idaea productata
7113 – Idaea miranda
7114 E – Idaea demissaria, red-bordered wave moth
7115 B – Idaea eremiata, straw wave moth
7116 W – Idaea gemmata
7117 W – Idaea occidentaria
7117.1 W – Idaea asceta
7118 E – Idaea hilliata, Hill's wave moth
7119 E – Idaea micropterata
7120 E – Idaea violacearia
7121 E – Idaea ostentaria, showy wave moth
7122 E – Idaea tacturata, dot-lined wave moth
7123 B – Idaea obfusaria, rippled wave moth
7124 E – Idaea retractaria
7125 E – Idaea rotundopennata
7126 B – Idaea dimidiata, single-dotted wave moth
7127 W – Paota fultaria
7128 W – Arcobara multilineata
7129 W – Arcobara perlineata
7130 B – Odontoptila obrimo
7131 – Ptychamalia dorneraria
7132 B – Pleuroprucha insulsaria, common tan wave moth
7133 E – Pleuroprucha asthenaria, asthene wave moth
7134 E – Cyclophora culicaria
7135 W – Cyclophora dataria
7136 E – Cyclophora packardi, Packard's wave moth
7137 E – Cyclophora myrtaria, waxmyrtle wave moth
7138 E – Cyclophora benjamini
7139 E – Cyclophora pendulinaria, sweetfern geometer moth
7140 B – Cyclophora nanaria
7141 – Semaeopus ella
7142 – Semaeopus gracilata
7143 – Semaeopus cantona
7144 – Semaeopus caecaria
7145 – Semaeopus marginata
7146 E – Haematopis grataria, chickweed geometer moth
7147 E – Timandra amaturaria, cross-lined wave moth
7148 E – Acratodes suavata
7149 E – Scopula lautaria, small frosted wave moth
7150 – Scopula eburneata
7151 E – Scopula aemulata
7152 E – Scopula compensata
7153 W – Scopula apparitaria
7154 B – Scopula plantagenaria
7155 – Scopula benitaria
7156 E – Scopula umbilicata, swag-lined wave moth
7157 E – Scopula cacuminaria, frosted tan wave moth
7158 E – Scopula purata, chalky wave moth
7159 E – Scopula limboundata, large lace-border moth
7160 E – Scopula timandrata
7161 E – Scopula ordinata
7162 B – Scopula ancellata, angled wave moth
7163 W – Scopula fuscata
7164 B – Scopula junctaria, simple wave moth
7164.1 E – Scopula quinquelinearia
7165 E – Scopula quadrilineata, four-lined wave moth
7166 E – Scopula frigidaria, frigid wave moth
7167 W – Scopula siccata
7168 W – Scopula septentrionicola
7169 B – Scopula inductata, soft-lined wave moth
7170 W – Scopula luteolata
7171 W – Scopula sideraria
7172 E – Scopula sentinaria
7173 E – Leptostales pannaria, pannaria wave moth
7174 E – Leptostales crossii, Cross's wave moth
7175 E – Leptostales hepaticaria
7176 E – Leptostales rubrotincta
7177 B – Leptostales laevitaria, raspberry wave moth
7178 E – Leptostales oblinataria
7179 B – Leptostales rubromarginaria, dark-ribboned wave moth
7180 E – Leptostales ferruminaria
7181 E – Lophosis labeculata, stained lophosis moth
7181.1 – Cambogia tegularia
7182 B – Dysstroma citrata, dark marbled carpet moth
7183 W – Dysstroma hewlettaria
7184 W – Dysstroma sobria
7185 E – Dysstroma suspectata
7186 W – Dysstroma ochrofuscaria
7187 B – Dysstroma truncata, marbled carpet moth
7188 B – Dysstroma walkerata, orange-spotted carpet moth
7189 E – Dysstroma hersiliata, orange-barred carpet moth
7190 W – Dysstroma rutlandia
7191 B – Dysstroma formosa, Formosa carpet moth
7192 W – Dysstroma colvillei
7193 W – Dysstroma rectiflavata
7194 B – Dysstroma brunneata
7195 W – Dysstroma mancipata
7196 E – Eulithis diversilineata, lesser grapevine looper moth
7197 E – Eulithis gracilineata, greater grapevine looper moth
7198 W – Eulithis luteolata
7199 E – Eulithis propulsata
7199.1 E – Eulithis prunata
7200 E – Eulithis populata
7201 E – Eulithis testata, chevron moth
7202 E – Eulithis mellinata
7203 E – Eulithis molliculata, dimorphic eulithis moth
7204 E – Eulithis destinata
7205 E – Eulithis flavibrunneata
7206 E – Eulithis explanata, white eulithis moth
7207 W – Eulithis xylina
7208 E – Eulithis serrataria, serrated eulithis moth
7209 W – Eurhinosea flavaria
7210 E – Eustroma semiatrata, black-banded carpet moth
7211 W – Eustroma fasciata
7212 W – Eustroma atrifasciata
7213 B – Ecliptopera silaceata, small phoenix moth
7214 – Ecliptopera atricolorata, dark-banded geometer moth
7215 W – Colostygia turbata
7216 B – Plemyria georgii, George's carpet moth
7217 E – Thera juniperata, juniper carpet moth
7218 E – Thera contractata, early juniper carpet moth
7219 W – Thera otisi
7220 W – Thera latens
7221 W – Ceratodalia gueneata
7222 W – Hydriomena tuolumne
7223 E – Hydriomena exculpata
7224 W – Hydriomena expurgata
7225 W – Hydriomena shasta
7226 W – Hydriomena borussata
7227 W – Hydriomena henshawi
7228 W – Hydriomena irata
7229 B – Hydriomena perfracta, shattered hydriomena moth
7230 W – Hydriomena charlestonia
7231 W – Hydriomena marinata
7232 W – Hydriomena edenata
7233 W – Hydriomena furtivata
7234 W – Hydriomena johnstoni
7235 E – Hydriomena divisaria, black-dashed hydriomena moth
7236 E – Hydriomena renunciata, renounced hydriomena moth
7237 E – Hydriomena transfigurata, transfigured hydriomena moth
7238 E – Hydriomena bistriolata
7239 E – Hydriomena pluviata, sharp green hydriomena moth
7240 W – Hydriomena obliquilinea
7241 W – Hydriomena rita
7242 W – Hydriomena arizonata
7243 W – Hydriomena albimontanata
7244 W – Hydriomena sierrae
7245 W – Hydriomena nevadae
7246 W – Hydriomena californiata
7247 W – Hydriomena crokeri
7248 W – Hydriomena glaucata
7249 W – Hydriomena muscata
7250 W – Hydriomena chiricahuata
7251 W – Hydriomena modestata
7252 E – Hydriomena mississippiensis
7253 W – Hydriomena feminata
7254 B – Hydriomena ruberata, ruddy highflyer moth
7255 W – Hydriomena macdunnoughi
7256 W – Hydriomena septemberata
7257 E – Hydriomena furcata, July highflyer moth
7258 W – Hydriomena quinquefasciata
7259 W – Hydriomena catalinata
7260 W – Hydriomena costipunctata
7261 W – Hydriomena albifasciata
7262 W – Hydriomena cochiseata
7263 W – Hydriomena speciosata
7264 W – Hydriomena morosata
7265 W – Hydriomena barnesata
7266 W – Hydriomena cyriadoides
7267 W – Hydriomena sperryi
7268 W – Hydriomena bryanti
7269 W – Hydriomena clarki
7270 W – Hydriomena magnificata
7271 W – Hydriomena gracillima
7272 W – Hydriomena regulata
7273 W – Hydriomena furculoides
7274 W – Hydriomena peratica
7275 W – Hydriomena similaris
7276 W – Hydriomena nubilofasciata, oak winter highflier moth
7277 W – Hydriomena manzanita
7278 W – Hymenodria mediodentata
7279 W – Ersephila indistincta
7280 W – Ersephila grandipennis
7281 W – Carptima hydriomenata
7282 W – Cyclica frondaria
7283 W – Grossbeckia semimaculata
7284 W – Eutrepsia inconstans
7285 B – Triphosa haesitata, tissue moth
7286 E – Triphosa affirmata
7287 W – Triphosa californiata
7288 W – Triphosa bipectinata
7289 W – Monostoecha semipectinata
7290 B – Coryphista meadii, barberry geometer moth
7291 B – Rheumaptera undulata
7292 E – Rheumaptera prunivorata, Ferguson's scallop shell moth
7293 E – Rheumaptera hastata, spear-marked black moth
7294 B – Rheumaptera subhastata, white-banded black moth
7295 W – Archirhoe neomexicana
7296 W – Archirhoe indefinata
7297 W – Archirhoe associata
7298 W – Archirhoe multipunctata
7299 E – Pterocypha floridata
7300 E – Entephria aurata
7300.1 W – Entephria beringiana
7300.2 E – Entephria bradorata
7300.3 W – Entephria kidluitata
7301 W – Entephria multivagata
7302 W – Entephria takuata
7303 W – Entephria lagganata
7303.1 W – Entephria lynda
7305 W – Entephria inventaraia
7306 B – Entephria polata
7306.1 W – Entephria punctipes
7306.2 E – Entephria separata
7307 E – Mesoleuca ruficillata, white-ribboned carpet moth
7308 W – Mesoleuca gratulata, western white-ribboned carpet moth
7309 W – Spargania viridescens
7310 W – Spargania aurata
7311 W – Spargania bellipicta
7312 E – Spargania magnoliata, double-banded carpet moth
7313 E – Spargania luctuata
7314 B – Hammaptera parinotata
7315 W – Psaliodes fervescens
7316 E – Perizoma basaliata, square-patched carpet moth
7317 W – Perizoma grandis
7318 W – Perizoma alaskae
7319 W – Perizoma actuata
7320 E – Perizoma alchemillata, small rivulet moth
7321 W – Perizoma interrupta
7322 W – Perizoma ochreata
7323 W – Perizoma oxygramma
7324 W – Perizoma curvilinea
7325 W – Perizoma costiguttata
7326 W – Perizoma epictata
7327 W – Perizoma ablata
7328 W – Perizoma custodiata
7329 E – Anticlea vasiliata, variable carpet moth
7330 B – Anticlea multiferata, many-lined carpet moth
7331 W – Anticlea switzeraria
7332 W – Anticlea pectinata
7333 E – Stamnodes gibbicostata, shiny gray carpet moth
7334 W – Stamnodes blackmorei
7335 W – Stamnodes albiapicata
7336 W – Stamnodes reckseckeri
7337 W – Stamnodes affiliata
7338 W – Stamnodes delicata
7339 W – Stamnodes mendocinoensis
7340 W – Stamnodes annellata
7341 W – Stamnodes coenonymphata
7342 W – Stamnodes eldridgensis
7343 W – Stamnodes marinata
7344 W – Stamnodes splendorata
7345 W – Stamnodes apollo
7346 W – Stamnodes artemis
7347 W – Stamnodes formosata
7348 W – Stamnodes lampra
7349 E – Stamnodes topazata
7350 W – Stamnodes franckata
7351 W – Stamnodes modocata
7352 W – Stamnodes cassinoi
7353 W – Stamnodes seiferti
7354 W – Stamnodes fervefactaria
7355 W – Stamnodes deceptiva
7356 W – Stamnoctenis morrisata
7357 W – Stamnoctenis pearsalli
7358 W – Stamnoctenis rubrosuffusa
7359 W – Stamnodes ululata
7360 W – Stamnodes costimacula
7361 W – Stamnodes similis
7362 W – Stamnoctenis vernon
7363 W – Stamnodes marmorata
7364 W – Stamnodes tessellata
7365 W – Stamnodes watsoni
7366 W – Stamnodes animata
7367 – Heterusia atalantata
7368 E – Xanthorhoe labradorensis, Labrador carpet moth
7369 E – Xanthorhoe packardata
7370 B – Xanthorhoe abrasaria
7371 E – Xanthorhoe iduata
7372 W – Xanthorhoe macdunnoughi
7373 E – Xanthorhoe ramaria
7374 W – Xanthorhoe incursata
7375 W – Xanthorhoe reclivisata
7376 E – Xanthorhoe baffinensis
7377 W – Xanthorhoe dodata
7378 E – Xanthorhoe algidata
7379 W – Xanthorhoe pontiaria
7380 W – Xanthorhoe fossaria
7381 W – Xanthorhoe montanata
7382 W – Xanthorhoe marinensis
7383 W – Xanthorhoe spaldingaria
7384 B – Xanthorhoe decoloraria
7385 W – Xanthorhoe alticolata
7386 W – Xanthorhoe defensaria
7387 W – Xanthorhoe offensaria
7388 E – Xanthorhoe ferrugata, red twin-spot moth
7389 – Xanthorhoe borealis
7389.1 W – Xanthorhoe clarkeata
7390 E – Xanthorhoe lacustrata, toothed brown carpet moth
7391 W – Xanthorhoe dentilinea
7392 W – Xanthorhoe mirabilata
7393 – Xanthorhoe columelloides
7394 E – Epirrhoe alternata, white-banded toothed carpet moth
7395 W – Epirrhoe plebeculata
7396 E – Epirrhoe sperryi
7397 W – Epirrhoe medeifascia
7398 W – Euphyia swetti
7399 B – Euphyia intermediata, sharp-angled carpet moth
7400 W – Euphyia implicata
7401 W – Euphyia minima
7402 W – Enchoria osculata
7403 W – Enchoria lacteata
7404 W – Enchoria herbicolata
7405 – Loxofidonia acidaliata
7406 B – Zenophleps lignicolorata
7407 W – Zenophleps pallescens
7408 B – Zenophleps alpinata
7409 W – Zenophleps obscurata
7410 W – Psychophora sabini
7411 E – Psychophora phocata
7412 E – Psychophora suttoni
7413 E – Psychophora immaculata
7414 B – Orthonama obstipata, gem moth
7415 E – Orthonama evansi
7416 B – Costaconvexa centrostrigaria, bent-line carpet moth
7417 E – Disclisioprocta stellata, somber carpet moth
7418 W – Herreshoffia gracea
7419 E – Hydrelia lucata, light carpet moth
7420 E – Hydrelia condensata
7421 – Hydrelia terraenovae
7422 E – Hydrelia inornata, unadorned carpet moth
7423 E – Hydrelia albifera, fragile white carpet moth
7424 W – Hydrelia brunneifasciata
7425 E – Venusia cambrica, Welsh wave moth
7426 W – Venusia duodecemlineata
7427 W – Venusia obsoleta
7428 E – Venusia comptaria, brown-shaded carpet moth
7429 W – Venusia pearsalli, Pearsall's carpet moth
7430 E – Trichodezia albovittata, white-striped black moth
7431 – Trichodezia albofasciata
7432 W – Trichodezia californiata
7433 B – Epirrita autumnata, autumnal moth
7434 W – Epirrita undulata
7435 W – Epirrita pulchraria, whitelined looper moth
7436 E – Operophtera brumata, winter moth
7437 B – Operophtera bruceata, bruce spanworm moth
7439 W – Operophtera danbyi
7439.1 – Tescalsia giulianiata
7439.2 – Tescalsia minata
7440 B – Eubaphe mendica, beggar moth
7440.1 – Eubaphe medea
7441 E – Eubaphe meridiana, little beggar moth
7442 – Eubaphe helveta
7443 W – Eubaphe rotundata
7444 W – Eubaphe unicolor
7445 B – Horisme intestinata, brown bark carpet moth
7446 B – Horisme incana
7447 – Horisme rectilineata
7448 – Horisme gillettei
7449 E – Eupithecia palpata, small pine looper moth
7451 E – Eupithecia slossonata
7452 W – Eupithecia albimontanata
7453 E – Eupithecia peckorum, Peck's pug moth
7454 B – Eupithecia longidens
7455 B – Eupithecia ornata
7456 W – Eupithecia monacheata
7457 W – Eupithecia terrestrata
7458 W – Eupithecia karenae
7459 E – Eupithecia columbiata
7460 W – Eupithecia maestosa
7461 W – Eupithecia subvirens
7462 W – Eupithecia castellata
7463 W – Eupithecia chiricahuata
7464 W – Eupithecia insolabilis
7465 W – Eupithecia catalinata
7466 W – Eupithecia edna
7467 W – Eupithecia owenata
7468 W – Eupithecia longipalpata
7469 W – Eupithecia sabulosata
7470 W – Eupithecia macrocarpata
7471 W – Eupithecia placidata
7472 W – Eupithecia unicolor
7473 W – Eupithecia pseudotsugata
7474 B – Eupithecia miserulata, common eupithecia moth
7475 – Eupithecia chlorofasciata
7476 B – Eupithecia misturata
7478 W – Eupithecia bivittata
7479 W – Eupithecia pygmaeata
7479.1 – Eupithecia broui
7480 W – Eupithecia bryanti
7481 E – Eupithecia coloradensis
7482 W – Eupithecia cretata
7483 B – Eupithecia regina
7484 B – Eupithecia undata
7485 B – Eupithecia borealis
7486 E – Eupithecia jejunata
7487 – Eupithecia subfuscata, grey pug moth
7488 E – Eupithecia tripunctaria
7489 – Eupithecia luteata
7490 W – Eupithecia harrisonata
7491 E – Eupithecia fletcherata
7492 E – Eupithecia casloata
7494 E – Eupithecia sheppardata
7495 E – Eupithecia affinata
7496 W – Eupithecia rotundopuncta
7497 W – Eupithecia sierrae
7498 W – Eupithecia litoris
7499 W – Eupithecia quakerata
7500 W – Eupithecia bolterii
7501 W – Eupithecia palmata
7502 W – Eupithecia piccata
7503 W – Eupithecia pretansata
7504 W – Eupithecia neomexicana
7505 W – Eupithecia alpinata
7506 W – Eupithecia prostrata
7507 W – Eupithecia persimulata
7508 – Eupithecia exudata
7509 B – Eupithecia herefordaria, Hereford's eupithecia moth
7509.1 B – Eupithecia matheri
7510 W – Eupithecia cazieri
7512 W – Eupithecia macdunnoughi
7513 W – Eupithecia nabokovi
7514 W – Eupithecia biedermanata
7515 W – Eupithecia cupressata
7516 E – Eupithecia albigrisata
7518 E – Eupithecia intricata
7519 W – Eupithecia uinta
7520 E – Eupithecia satyrata
7520.3 E – Eupithecia dodata
7522 E – Eupithecia nimbicolor
7523 E – Eupithecia strattonata
7524 E – Eupithecia cimicifugata
7526 E – Eupithecia russeliata
7527 B – Eupithecia ammonata
7530 E – Eupithecia swettii
7531 E – Eupithecia indistincta
7532 W – Eupithecia zygadeniata
7533 B – Eupithecia cretaceata
7534 W – Eupithecia nimbosa
7535 W – Eupithecia behrensata
7536 W – Eupithecia multiscripta
7537 – Eupithecia sewardata
7537.1 E – Eupithecia sharronata
7538 E – Eupithecia gelidata
7539 W – Eupithecia multistrigata
7540 E – Eupithecia perfusca
7543 B – Eupithecia annulata, larch pug moth
7544 – Eupithecia vinsullata
7546 W – Eupithecia olivacea
7547 W – Eupithecia cognizata
7548 W – Eupithecia lachrymosa
7548.1 W – Eupithecia lafontaineata
7548.2 E – Eupithecia lariciata, larch pug moth
7551 B – Eupithecia interruptofasciata, juniper looper moth
7552 W – Eupithecia niphadophilata
7553 W – Eupithecia subcolorata
7554 W – Eupithecia appendiculata
7554.1 E – Eupithecia assimilata
7555 W – Eupithecia zelmira
7555.1 – Eupithecia vicksburgi
7555.2 – Eupithecia fredericki
7556 W – Eupithecia vitreotata
7557 W – Eupithecia segregata
7558 W – Eupithecia pinata
7559 W – Eupithecia tenuata
7560 W – Eupithecia phyllisae
7561 W – Eupithecia agnesata
7562 W – Eupithecia huachuca
7563 W – Eupithecia woodgatata
7564 B – Eupithecia stellata
7565 E – Eupithecia bowmani
7566 W – Eupithecia niveifascia
7567 W – Eupithecia joanata
7568 W – Eupithecia flavigutta
7568.1 W – Eupithecia sonora
7569 W – Eupithecia sperryi
7570 E – Eupithecia johnstoni
7571 W – Eupithecia dichroma
7572 W – Eupithecia rindgei
7573 E – Eupithecia cocoata
7574 B – Eupithecia albicapitata
7575 E – Eupithecia mutata, spruce cone looper moth
7576 W – Eupithecia helena
7578 W – Eupithecia spermaphaga
7579 W – Eupithecia purpurissata
7580 W – Eupithecia mystiata
7581 W – Eupithecia gilvipennata
7583 W – Eupithecia scabrogata
7584 W – Eupithecia hohokamae
7585 W – Eupithecia adequata
7586 W – Eupithecia acutipennis
7586.1 B – Eupithecia absinthiata
7587 W – Eupithecia subapicata
7588 W – Eupithecia shirleyata
7589 W – Eupithecia sinuata
7590 W – Eupithecia redingtonia
7591 W – Eupithecia gilata
7592 W – Eupithecia plumasata
7593 W – Eupithecia jamesi
7594 B – Eupithecia anticaria
7595 W – Eupithecia pertusata
7596 W – Eupithecia tricolorata
7597 W – Eupithecia carneata
7598 W – Eupithecia classicata
7600 W – Eupithecia graefii
7601 W – Eupithecia nevadata
7602 W – Eupithecia implorata
7603 W – Eupithecia cestata
7604 W – Eupithecia cestatoides
7605 B – Eupithecia ravocostaliata, tawny eupithecia moth
no number yet – Eupithecia macfarlandi
no number yet – Eupithecia nonanticaria
no number yet – Eupithecia penablanca
7606 W – Nasusina inferior
7606.1 W – Nasusina vallis
7607 W – Nasusina vaporata
7608 W – Nasusina mendicata
7609 W – Nasusina minuta
7610 W – Prorella emmedonia
7611 W – Prorella gypsata
7612 W – Prorella discoidalis
7613 W – Prorella leucata
7614 W – Prorella albida
7615 W – Prorella ochrocarneata
7616 W – Prorella irremorata
7617 W – Prorella tremorata
7618 W – Prorella remorata
7619 W – Prorella desperata
7620 W – Prorella artestata
7621 W – Prorella mellisa
7622 W – Prorella insipidata
7623 W – Prorella opinata
7624 – Prorella protoptata
7625 E – Pasiphila rectangulata, green pug moth
7626 E – Carsia sororiata
7627 B – Aplocera plagiata, treble-bar moth
7628 W – Lithostege rotundata
7629 W – Lithostege fuscata
7630 – Lithostege marcata
7631 W – Lithostege elegans
7632 W – Lithostege angelicata
7633 W – Lithostege deserticola
7634 W – Scelidacantha triseriata
7635 E – Acasis viridata, olive-and-black carpet moth
7636 W – Trichopteryx veritata
7637 B – Cladara limitaria, mottled gray carpet moth
7638 E – Cladara anguilineata, angle-lined carpet moth
7639 E – Cladara atroliturata, scribbler moth
7640 E – Lobophora nivigerata, powdered bigwing moth
7641 W – Lobophora montanata
7642 W – Lobophora simsata
7643 W – Lobophora magnoliatoidata
7644 W – Lobophora canavestita
7645 E – Heterophleps refusaria, three-patched bigwing moth
7646 – Heterophleps morensata
7647 E – Heterophleps triguttaria, three-spotted fillip moth
7648 E – Dyspteris abortivaria, badwing moth

See also
List of butterflies of North America
List of Lepidoptera of Hawaii
List of moths of Canada
List of butterflies of Canada

External links
Checklists of North American Moths

Moths of North America
North America